is a Japanese voice actress from Fukuoka Prefecture. She is affiliated with the Unicorn-Star talent agency. Previously, she was affiliated with Amuleto, Mediarte, Office Mori and Super Shark entertainment.

Filmography

Anime
2009
Gintama as Child A
The Beast Player Erin as Shiron

2010
K-On! as Classmate

2011
Steins;Gate as Boy
Zoobles! as Chevy

2012
Shimajirō no Wow! as Kikko Hayashida

Original video animation (OVA)
Hiyokoi as Haruko

References

External links
 Official blog 
 

1985 births
Living people
Japanese voice actresses
Voice actresses from Fukuoka Prefecture